The media coverage of the 2019 India-Pakistan standoff was criticised for largely being "jingoistic" and "nationalistic", to the extent of the media war-mongering and the battle being fought between India and Pakistan through newsrooms. During the escalation, fake videos and misinformation were prevalent on the social media which were further reported to escalate tensions between India and Pakistan. Once tensions started de-escalating, the media coverage shifted to comparisons being made between "India and Pakistan" and "Narendra Modi and Imran Khan" in terms of who won the "perception battle".

Background 
Propaganda and psychological warfare through the media is an old concept. The media in both India and Pakistan are important "stakeholders" during times of heightened tensions between the two countries. Previous studies conducted have suggested the "nationalistic" role of the media in relation to India and Pakistan conflicts. A Bournemouth University doctoral study by Chindu Sreedharan concluded the dominance of "anti-peace news" in the overall coverage of Kashmir suggesting that the press in India and Pakistan has a counterproductive role in the Kashmir issue and that the "coverage was vigorously government-led and intensely 'negative'". A study in the Pakistan Journal of History and Culture found that newspapers of both countries (India and Pakistan) were "setting the agenda on Kashmir issue positively in the light of foreign policy of their respective country".

War mongering 
Various accusations were made against the sections of the Indian and Pakistani media for war-mongering. Indian Nobel Peace Prize laureate Kailash Satyarthi acknowledged the war-mongering prevalent among the Indian media, but added that there were many journalists trying to "de-escalate" the situation too.  Both in India and Pakistan, media unions called for a stop on the war-mongering. A story in Quartz quotes Indian journalist Sadanand Dhume (a fellow at the American think tank American Enterprise Institute) where he says "Paradoxically, the over-zealous Indian media and Pakistani media may help prevent escalation of conflict." Foreign Policy came out with an article titled "India’s Media Is War-Crazy". According to it, Indian journalists were very much willing to “reproduce unverified, contradictory and speculative information” that suited the Indian government.

Perception war 
Ajai Shukla, an Indian journalist and former Indian Army colonel, writes in Al Jazeera that "Pakistan won the perception war", however adds that Pakistan is losing out in other ways. A report in an Indian media digital website, Scroll.in, was titled "How Imran Khan stumped Narendra Modi in the perception battle over air strikes" where it criticises Narendra Modi for not addressing the media directly during the crisis as compared to Imran Khan who addressed the media directly during the crisis more than once, and in turn directed the narrative. A report in a Pakistani newspaper The News International however said that even if Imran Khan and Narendra Modi won the perception battles in their respective constituencies, neither side wanted a war according to Vipin Narang, a professor at Massachusetts Institute of Technology (MIT).

Fake news and fact-checking 

Various media houses resorted to fact-checking related to misinformation related to Air Marshal Chandrashekharan Hari Kumar, Wing Commander Abhinandan Varthanman, F-16s, an Indian submarine and various other things. It was reported after the Balakot airstrikes on 26 February, a fact checking website "Check4Spam" reported a 79% increase in traffic. Old videos and photographs of "crashing fighter jets" were being circulated in both India and Pakistan during the crisis as recent events.

See also 

 Media coverage of the Iraq War
 Media coverage of the Arab–Israeli conflict
 Media coverage of the Syrian Civil War
 Media coverage of the Virginia Tech shooting

References

Further reading 

 "‘No self-respecting govt can get off the escalation ladder’: Indian and Pakistani media fight to form narrative" - Washington Post
 "The India-Pakistan Conflict was a parade of lies" - 6 March 2019, New York Times
 Media, Policymaking, and Public Opinion in India-Pakistan Crises (Stimson Centre, 2018)
 Babel as narrative: The media, a mediated war and I (7 March 2019, Observer Research Foundation)
 Indian media trumpeting about Pakistani fake news should look in the mirror first (28 February 2019, QZ India)
 A look at what the international media is saying about Indo-Pak war games (28 February 2019, Newslaundry)
 Wing Commander Abhinandan slams Indian media's gross coverage (1 March 2019, Pakistan Today)
 ‘Army Isn’t Asking for War, Indian Media Is’: Journalism Students (8 March 2019, The Quint)
 Speaking Truth to Power: The Indian Media's Descent from Sharp Hawks to Screeching Parrots (12 March 2019, The Hindu Centre)
 India and Pakistan must break free of their shackles (6 March 2019, Gulf News)

Media coverage and representation
War and the media
Mass media in India
Mass media in Pakistan